Fairstead may refer to one of the following:

 Fairstead, Essex, a village and civil parish in England
 Fairstead, Norfolk, a housing estate in King's Lynn, England
 Fairstead (company), a New York-based real estate developer